The wine industry in the U.S. state of Alabama received a boost in 2002 when agricultural reforms lifted restrictions on wineries.  Most wineries in the state focus on French hybrid grape varieties and the Muscadine grape, rather than Vitis vinifera grapes, which are vulnerable to Pierce's disease.  There are no designated American Viticultural Areas in the state of Alabama.

References

 
Tourism in Alabama
Agriculture in Alabama
Wine regions of the United States by state